Stanley John Trafford (21 December 1945 – 19 November 2020) was an English footballer and cricketer. He played his football for Port Vale and Macclesfield Town, and his cricket for Staffordshire.

Early life 
Trafford was born in Leek, Staffordshire on 21 December 1945.  He was a keen football and cricket player in his youth and once took four wickets in four balls when playing for his school side.  Trafford also played for the Port Vale youth team.

Football career
Trafford signed for Port Vale as a professional under manager Freddie Steele in October 1964. He made 12 Third Division appearances and scored one goal during the 1964–65 season. Making his first team debut at Vale Park on 17 October, in a 2–1 defeat to Bristol City, it was reported that "the loud mouths on the terraces certainly did a good job [of] hindering Stan Trafford". He scored his only goal in the English Football League in a 2–1 win over Oldham Athletic on 15 March. He was handed a free transfer by new boss Jackie Mudie in April 1965. He signed with Macclesfield Town of the Cheshire County League in January 1966, and made ten appearances before leaving Moss Rose in the summer.

Trafford was a member of Port Vale's ex-players association and attended a game at the club in the 2019–20 season.  He remained close friends with former team-mate Terry Lowe.

Cricket career
In cricket, Trafford made his debut for Staffordshire in 1963, playing two matches that season against Northumberland and Durham in the Minor Counties Cricket Championship. Trafford next appeared for Staffordshire in 1976, playing two further Minor Counties Championship matches against Cheshire and Shropshire. It was in 1976 that Trafford played his only List A match, which came against Essex in the Gillette Cup. In this match, he was dismissed for a single run by John Lever. He retired as a player in 1984.

Trafford was associated with Leek Cricket Club for 60 years, as a junior cricketer and later as a committee member and club secretary. Leek won the NSSCL Premier Division, Talbot Cup and Staffordshire Cup whilst Trafford was club secretary in 2001. He also spent 25 years coaching Staffordshire Under-19s.

Trafford's death was announced by Port Vale on 19 November 2020, at the age of 74.

Career statistics
Source:

References

1945 births
2020 deaths
Sportspeople from Leek, Staffordshire
English footballers
Association football forwards
Port Vale F.C. players
Macclesfield Town F.C. players
English Football League players
English cricketers
Staffordshire cricketers